Alexandru Epureanu (born 27 September 1986) is a Moldovan professional footballer who plays as a centre-back for Süper Lig club Ümraniyespor and the Moldova national team.

Club career
Born in Chișinau, Epureanu joined FC Sheriff Tiraspol in summer 2004.

He has won Moldovan Footballer of the Year in 2007, 2009, 2010, 2012 and 2018. Since playing for FC Sheriff Tiraspol, he has gone on to play for Dinamo Moscow.

On 2 July 2014, Epureanu signed for İstanbul Başakşehir. He made his league debut for the club on 30 August 2014 in a 1–1 home draw with Kasımpaşa, playing all ninety minutes of the match. He scored his first league goal for the club on 5 October 2014 in a 4–0 home victory over Akhisarspor. His goal, scored in the sixth minute, made the score 1–0 to İstanbul BB.

In January 2023, Epureanu departed Başakşehir and subsequently joined Ümraniyespor until the end of the season.

International career
Epureanu made his international debut in a 2–0 UEFA Euro 2008 qualifying loss against Norway on 6 September 2006, and has since been a regular in the national team, wearing the captain's armband on several occasions. In September 2019, Epureanu retired from the national team due to a knee injury. However, he returned in August 2020, and is still active for Moldova. He ranks first in terms of all-time appearances for Moldova. On 31 March 2021, he made his 100th appearance for Moldova in a 2022 FIFA World Cup qualification match against Israel.

Career statistics

Club

International

Scores and results list Moldova's goal tally first.

Note: Some sources have credited Epureanu with scoring the second goal in a 4–0 victory over Saudi Arabia in 2014, however this was a penalty converted by Igor Picușceac.

Honours

Club
Zimbru Chișinău
Moldovan Cup: 2003–04

Sheriff Tiraspol
Divizia Naţională: 2004–05, 2005–06
Moldovan Cup:  2005–06
Moldovan Supercup: 2005

Dynamo Moscow
Russian Cup runner-up: 2011–12

İstanbul Başakşehir
Turkish Cup runner-up: 2016–17
Süper Lig: 2019–20

Individual
Moldovan Footballer of the Year: 2007, 2009, 2010, 2012, 2018
Süper Lig Defender of the Year: 2018–19
Süper Lig Team of the Year: 2018–19

See also
 List of men's footballers with 100 or more international caps

References

External links

1986 births
Living people
Footballers from Chișinău
Moldovan footballers
Moldovan expatriate footballers
Moldova international footballers
Association football defenders
Moldovan Super Liga players
Russian Premier League players
Süper Lig players
FC Zimbru Chișinău players
FC Sheriff Tiraspol players
FC Moscow players
FC Dynamo Moscow players
PFC Krylia Sovetov Samara players
FC Anzhi Makhachkala players
İstanbul Başakşehir F.K. players
Ümraniyespor footballers
Moldovan expatriate sportspeople in Russia
Moldovan expatriate sportspeople in Turkey
Expatriate footballers in Russia
Expatriate footballers in Turkey
FIFA Century Club